Amazon Publishing (simply APub) is Amazon's book publishing unit launched in 2009. It is composed of 15 imprints including AmazonEncore, AmazonCrossing, Montlake Romance, Thomas & Mercer, 47North, and TOPPLE Books.

Amazon publishes e-books via its Kindle Direct Publishing subsidiary.

History 

In May 2009, Amazon launched AmazonEncore, the inaugural flagship general imprint. It publishes titles that have gone out-of-print or self-published books with sales potential. The first book published under this imprint was Cayla Kluver's Legacy in August 2009. Other early books published by AmazonEncore include Mercury Falls by Robert Kroese, Shaken by J.A. Konrath, The Grove by John Rector and A Scattered Life by Karen McQuestion.

AmazonCrossing was announced in May 2010, for translated works into English. The first translated books were the French-language novel The King of Kahel and the German-language novel The Hangman's Daughter which were released in November and December 2010, respectively.

In May 2011, Amazon launched two genre-focused imprints, Montlake Romance, and Thomas & Mercer. Montlake Romance is an imprint for the romance genre; "Romance is one of our biggest and fastest growing categories, particularly among Kindle customers," said Jeff Belle, vice president of Amazon Publishing. Thomas & Mercer is for mystery titles.

Powered by Amazon is a self-publishing platform that allows the publication of a series of books under any imprint name. For example, in May 2011, Seth Godin launched The Domino Project, an imprint created to publish a series of manifestos. It was the inaugural Powered by Amazon imprint project. Godin decided to end the imprint in November 2011, the 12 previously published titles would still be sold at Amazon, but no new books would be published. Also in May, it was announced Amazon had hired Larry Kirshbaum, former CEO of Time Warner Book Group, to head a new general-interest imprint. In October, Amazon launched a science-fiction/fantasy/horror imprint called 47 North. In December, Amazon Publishing acquired over 450 titles of Marshall Cavendish's US Children's trade books business, Marshall Cavendish Children's Books (MCCB).

In January 2012, it was revealed that Amazon Publishing's New York publishing arm, called "Amazon Publishing's East Coast Group" (run by Larry Kirshbaum), made a deal with Houghton Mifflin Harcourt to sell books under a pseudonym imprint called New Harvest. New Harvest only included books from Amazon Publishing, and the books had a New Harvest imprint on the spine. This allowed Amazon to sell books at retailers like Barnes & Noble, which otherwise had disallowed Amazon imprints in its stores. Barnes & Noble however later announced it would not stock any Amazon imprints, including New Harvest, a move mirrored by other book stores which have also banned Amazon imprints from their stores. One of the inaugural titles published by New Harvest was Jeff, One Lonely Guy, by Jeff Ragsdale, released on March 20, 2012.

In June 2012, Amazon purchased Avalon Books, a small 62-year-old publisher that specializes in romance and mysteries with a back-list of around 3,000 titles. The books will be published under Amazon's imprints based in Seattle. In November, it was announced that Laurence Kirshbaum's position would expand to include "editorial leadership for the Seattle and New York adult imprints, as well as Amazon Children's Publishing." In addition it was announced that Amazon would be opening a new European publishing division, which will focus on "expanding the English-language audience through its English-language bookstores in the U.K., Germany, France, Italy, and Spain." Vicky Griffith, formerly publisher of the Seattle imprints, will be the new EU publisher. In December 2012, Brilliance Audio, a division of Amazon, announced the creation of a publishing imprint called Grand Harbor Press which will focus on original self-help and inspirational hardcover, paperback and e-books.

In January 2013, Amazon announced two children's and young adult imprints. The first imprint is called Two Lions, featuring picture books, chapter books, and middle-grade fiction. The second imprint is called Skyscape, publishing fiction for young adults. In March, Amazon announced a New York-based literary fiction imprint that will publish novels, short stories and memoir. Called Little A, it was initially overseen by senior editor Ed Park. Amazing Publishing launched its comic book and graphic novel imprint, Jet City Comics, on July 9. Jet City Comics will be adapting existing books into comics for Kindle e-reader and print.

In October 2013, Amazon Publishing announced a new weekly digital literary magazine called Day One. The magazine focused on short fiction and poetry, including works from new authors and foreign authors in English translation. Each issue looked at one fiction writer and one poet each week, including a short story and poem with each issue. The issues were accessed through Kindle devices. Issues contained an introductory essay about a writer, author interviews, illustrations and playlists. The phrase "Day One" has often been used by Bezos in annual reports to shareholders as a way to experiment and fight complacency: "This is still Day 1."

In March, 2014, Amazon Publishing opened a German-language department based in Munich under the direction of publisher Sarah Tomashek. According to Amazon, the "European Amazon Publishing team will acquire German-language fiction for publication in Kindle and print editions available on Amazon websites."

In November, 2017, Amazon Publishing announced a new imprint Amazon Original Stories for works of fiction and non-fiction that can be read in a single sitting ranging from 5,000 to 20,000 words.

In February 2018, Amazon Publishing announced a new imprint TOPPLE Books focused on revolutionary feminist voices with Jill Soloway as the Editor-at-Large.

Weathervane 
During the 1999 Christmas season, Amazon leased the rights to a defunct imprint called Weathervane. This was Amazon's first attempt at publishing. The titles included Christmas recipe books and others without much market appeal, they were the "creatures from the black lagoon of the remainder table" according to a former employee James Marcus. The imprint soon disappeared, and according to "representatives at [Amazon] today claim never to have heard of [Weathervane]."

Publishers 
Larry Kirshbaum was the first publisher when Amazon Publishing was founded in 2009. He was based in New York City. In January 2014, Laurence Kirshbaum left the company. According to Publishers Weekly, "Under his direction, Amazon Publishing has had a difficult time gaining traction in the marketplace and failed to deliver any major bestsellers. In addition to the lackluster performance of the group, Kirshbaum drew unwanted attention in the summer of 2013 when a lawsuit was filed against him for sexual assault."

Kirshbaum was replaced by Daphne Durham who has spent her entire career at Amazon and is based in Seattle. Durham left the company a year later to "seek time off". Mikyla Bruder became the publisher on January 16, 2015, and was responsible for most of the imprints; she is based in Seattle. In addition David Blum was named publisher and editor in chief of the Little A and Two Lions imprints; he is based in New York City.

Kindle Worlds 
See main article Kindle Worlds

Kindle Worlds was established on May 22, 2013, as part of Amazon Publishing devoted to providing a commercial venue for fan fiction creations of specific licensed media properties. Amazon shut down the Kindle Worlds In August 2018.

Criticism 
In a 2014 article in The New Yorker, George Packer writes that nearly all of Amazon Publishing's books have under-performed. For example, it purchased two high-profile books at auction including Timothy Ferriss' The 4-Hour Chef for 1 million dollars, which did worse than his previous titles; and My Mother Was Nuts, a memoir by Penny Marshall, for eight-hundred thousand dollars, which only sold seventeen thousand copies. Actors Anonymous, a novel by James Franco, has sold fewer than five thousand copies. Packer says "In the past year [2012-2013], Amazon Publishing has barely been a presence at auctions, and several editors have departed; last month [January 2014], Kirshbaum left the company, having failed at the task Amazon gave him." Reasons given for the poor performance include: bookstores which refuse to carry Amazon titles since Amazon is a direct competitor; incompetence as a publisher (as one New York publisher said about Amazon, "There are certain things it takes to be a publisher. You have to have luck, but you also have to have judgment, discernment."); and Amazon's culture of machines, algorithms and mass products which don't fit well with the publishing world's emphasis on human networking and reputation.

List of imprints

References

External links 
 
 "The Truth About Amazon Publishing", Laura Hazard Owen, PaidContent.org, November 2, 2011.
 "Uncovering Amazon Publishing", David Streitfeld, New York Times, November 4, 2011.

Amazon (company)
Book publishing companies based in Seattle
2009 establishments in Washington (state)
American companies established in 2009
Publishing companies established in 2009